Iavoloha Palace is the official residence of the President of Madagascar. It is situated 15 km to the south from the capital Antananarivo. Iavoloha was modeled on the Rova of Antananarivo and was built by North Korea in the 1970s for free.

References

See also
 Ambohitsorohitra Palace, another office of the president

Presidential residences
Buildings and structures in Antananarivo
Government of Madagascar